A. Zerega's Sons, Inc. was a privately owned pasta company with plants in Fair Lawn, New Jersey and Lee's Summit, Missouri. The company was founded by Antoine Zerega in Brooklyn, New York in 1848 making it the first pasta company in the United States. Antoine's son Frank was a pasta maker for 83 years and served as the company's president. Both Zerega Avenue in the Bronx and the elevated train station on the New York City Subway's Pelham Line were named after Antoine. The company moved from Brooklyn at 28 Front Street to Fair Lawn in 1952.

In May 2020 it was announced that Zerega's was sold to fifth-generation family-owned Philadelphia Macaroni.

Notes

Companies based in Bergen County, New Jersey
Food and drink companies established in 1848
History of New York City
Lee's Summit, Missouri
American pasta companies
1848 establishments in New York (state)